Ekaterina Alexandrova was the defending champion, and successfully defended her title, defeating Aliaksandra Sasnovich in the final 6–1, 6–3.

Seeds

Draw

Finals

Top half

Bottom half

Qualifying

Seeds

Qualifiers

Qualifying draw

First qualifier

Second qualifier

Third qualifier

Fourth qualifier

References

External Links
Main Draw
Qualifying Draw

Open de Limoges - Singles
Open de Limoges